This is a list of ships owned by the Compagnie Générale Transatlantique, commonly known as the French Line.

See also
 List of ocean liners

External links
 History of the Compagnie Générale Transatlantique
 Compagnie Générale Transatlantique - French Line